The Fugger family was a prominent banking and mercantile family in Europe in the 14th–17th centuries.

Fugger may also refer to:

Jakob Fugger (1459-1525), the most prominent member of the Fugger family